Gibbons are apes in the family Hylobatidae.

Gibbon may also refer to:

Places
Gibbon, Minnesota, USA
Gibbon, Nebraska, USA
Gibbon, Oregon, USA
Gibbon Bay, South Orkney Islands, Antarctica
Ray Gibbon Drive, St Albert, Canada

Other uses
Gibbon (surname)
Edward Gibbon, English historian
Gibbon (comics), a character in Marvel Comics' Spider-Man titles
Gibbon, a Death Eater character in Harry Potter
scallion, an edible plant with hollow green leaves
Malte Gårdinger, a Swedish actor

See also
Gibbons (surname), a surname
Gutsy Gibbon, a 2007 release of Ubuntu
"Funky Gibbon", a 1975 song by The Goodies
Gibbons (disambiguation)